The discography of The Dubliners, an Irish folk band with record sales in excess of 30 million. Their discography consists of nineteen studio albums, twenty-four compilation albums, twenty-three singles and a number of other appearances. The Dubliners as of 2019 now tour under the name The Dublin Legends.

Studio albums

Live albums
No Irish Album Chart Archive until 2003.

Compilation albums

Singles

Other charted songs

Music videos

Dubliner Members Discography
 Luke Kelly discography
 Ronnie Drew discography

Notes

References

External links
 Unofficial The Dubliners website

Discography
Discographies of Irish artists
Folk music discographies